Jane (Martha) Brox (born 1956) is an American author, who specializes in non-fiction works.  Her father was John Brox (1910–1995). She graduated from Colby College in 1978 and currently lives in Maine.

Awards and honors
1996 L.L. Winship/PEN New England Award, Here and Nowhere Else: Late Seasons of a Farm and Its Family

Works
Books
Here and Nowhere Else: Late Seasons of a Farm and Its Family (1995,)
Five Thousand Days Like This One: An American Family History (1999, Beacon Press, Boston MA)
Clearing Land, Legacies of the American Farm (2004)
Brilliant, the Evolution of Artificial Light (2010)
Silence: A Social History of One of the Least Understood Elements of Our Lives (2019, Houghton Mifflin Harcourt 

Other works
Brox's website lists 30 magazine articles that she has written
The website lists 9 publications which have carried her poetry
The website lists 7 published book reviews written by Brox
The website lists 11 radio essays produced by Brox, carried primarily by NPR

References

Jane Brox website

American women writers
1956 births
Colby College alumni
Living people
21st-century American women